Prem Kishore Patakha (Hindi: प्रेम किशोर 'पटाखा'; born 27 October 1943) is a Hindi author of comedic poetry (hasya kavi). He was born into a Brahmin family at Aligarh, Uttar Pradesh. He appeared as a guest on the television programme of Bollywood actor Bharat Bhushan.

Published works

Writer
'101 Amar Kathayen'Kitabghar Prakashan

Comical literature
'Ranga Rang Hasya Kavi Sammelan'
'Shreshtha Hasya Vyangya Geet' with Ashok Anjum for Prabhat Prakashan
'Vyangya Kathaon Ka Sansar'
'Hasya Avam Vyangyang Gazalein' with Ashok Anjum for Pustak Mahal

Children's literature
'Shabash Daddy ',

Editing
 'Hasya-Vinod Kavya Kosh' for Kitabghar Prakashan

Lokpal Bill
Patakha also member of Anna Hazare's India Against Corruption.

Awards
 Hasy Ratn Shikhar Shri Shamman year 1986.
 Shikhar Shri Samman year 1988.
 Baal Sakha Shri year 1990.
 Chitra Kala Sangam Nayi Delhi year 2009.

Personal life
He has one son and one grandson. Patakha's niece 'Kajal' died in a road accident in Kurawali, Mainpuri.

References

External links
 Personal blog (Hindi)
 Books by Prem Kishore Patakha at Pustak.org
 Books by Prem Kishore Patakha at Jain book agency.com

Hindi-language poets
Living people
1943 births
People from Aligarh
Indian humorists
Hindi language